The Victorian Secondary Teachers Association (VSTA) was a Victorian trade union organisation which existed from 1953 to 1995. It was originally established in 1948, as the Victorian Secondary Masters' Professional Association, following a breakaway from the Victorian Teachers' Union, and became the VSTA in 1953. In 1995, the VSTA amalgamated with the Federated Teachers' Union of Victoria, which represented primary and technical teachers, to become the Victorian Branch of the Australian Education Union.

See also

Australian Education Union

References

External links
Challenging Masculine Privilege: The Women's Movement and the Victorian Secondary Teachers Association, 1974–1995

History of Australia (1945–present)
Education trade unions
1953 establishments in Australia
Trade unions established in 1953
Trade unions disestablished in 1995
1995 disestablishments in Australia
Defunct trade unions of Australia
History of education in Australia
Education-related professional associations
Teaching in Australia